Baird's top shell may refer to:

Bathybembix bairdii,  of the family Calliotropida
Calliostoma bairdii, a calliostoma top snail

Animal common name disambiguation pages